The British Library Philatelic Department Photograph Collection is a collection of photographs of philatelic material not in the British Library Philatelic Collections. Mostly composed of material donated by philatelic auctioneers, the collection is an important resource for researchers.

References

British Library Philatelic Collections